Royal Waltz (French: Valse royale) is a 1936 French-German historical film directed by Jean Grémillon and starring Henri Garat, Renée Saint-Cyr and Christian-Gérard.

It is the French-language version of the German film Königswalzer, made in Berlin by UFA. The film's art direction was by Robert Herlth and Walter Röhrig. Raoul Ploquin, who specialised in co-productions acted as supervisor.

Cast
 Henri Garat as Michel de Thalberg  
 Renée Saint-Cyr as Thérèse Tomasoni  
 Christian-Gérard as Pilou 
 Adrien Le Gallo as Le roi Max de Bavière
 Mila Parély as Annie Tomasini  
 Bernard Lancret as L'empereur François Joseph d'Autriche  
 Alla Donell as La princesse Elisabeth de Bavière, nommée Sissi  
 Gustave Gallet as Ludwig Tomasoni  
 Lucien Dayle as Gargamus  
 Geymond Vital as René  
 Edmond Beauchamp as Maps  
 Georges Prieur as Le comte Thalberg  
 Jean Aymé as de Borney  
 Gaston Dubosc 
 Georgette Lamoureux

References

Bibliography 
 Crisp, Colin. Genre, Myth and Convention in the French Cinema, 1929-1939. Indiana University Press, 2002.

External links 
 

1936 films
1936 multilingual films
1930s historical musical films
French historical musical films
German historical musical films
1930s French-language films
Films directed by Jean Grémillon
Films set in the 1850s
Films set in Austria
Films set in Bavaria
French multilingual films
UFA GmbH films
German black-and-white films
French black-and-white films
Films set in the Austrian Empire
1930s French films
1930s German films